Clark Mills may refer to:

Clark Mills, New York
Clark Mills (sculptor) (1810–1883), American sculptor
Clark Mills (boatbuilder) (1915–2001),  American designer and builder of boats

Mills, Clark